Robin Haase and Ken Skupski were the defending champions, but Haase decided not to participate.
Skupski played alongside Jamie Delgado but were eliminated in the semifinals.
Nicolas Mahut and Édouard Roger-Vasselin defeated Dustin Brown and Jo-Wilfried Tsonga 3–6, 6–3, [10–6] in the final to win the title.

Seeds

Draw

Draw

References
 Main Draw

Open 13 - Doubles
2012 Doubles